Topaz (also Topaz Post Office) is an unincorporated community and census-designated place (CDP) in Mono County, California, United States. Topaz's ZIP Code is 96133. The population was 150 at the 2020 census.

History
The Topaz post office opened in 1885, closed in 1922, and re-opened in 1926. The name was transferred from the original site of the village, which developed on the ranch of T.B. Rickey. Mrs. Rickey named it based on the color of the local quaking aspen trees. The post office is now located and has been operated by the Robert William Mckay Family Ranch since the 1920s.

Geography
Topaz is the northernmost community in Mono County. It is bordered to the south by the community of Coleville and to the northeast by the Nevada state line. The community of Topaz Lake, Nevada, touches the northernmost part of the Topaz border. According to the Mono County government, Antelope Valley, including Topaz, is expected to see significant population growth.

U.S. Route 395 passes through Topaz, leading south  to Bridgeport, the Mono county seat, and north  to Carson City, Nevada. Topaz is drained by the West Walker River, which flows north into Nevada. Topaz Lake occupies the northwest corner of the Topaz CDP and extends north into Nevada.

Climate
This region experiences warm (but not hot) and dry summers, with no average monthly temperatures above .  According to the Köppen Climate Classification system, Topaz has a warm-summer Mediterranean climate, abbreviated "Csb" on climate maps.

Demographics
The 2010 United States Census reported that Topaz had a population of 50. The racial makeup of Topaz was 44 (88.0%) White, 0 (0.0%) African American, 1 (2.0%) Native American, 0 (0.0%) Asian, 0 (0.0%) Pacific Islander, 5 (10.0%) from other races, and 0 (0.0%) from two or more races. Hispanic or Latino of any race were 24 persons (48.0%).

The Census reported that 50 people (100% of the population) lived in households, 0 (0%) lived in non-institutionalized group quarters, and 0 (0%) were institutionalized.

There were 21 households, out of which 5 (23.8%) had children under the age of 18 living in them, 13 (61.9%) were opposite-sex married couples living together, 0 (0%) had a female householder with no husband present, 0 (0%) had a male householder with no wife present.  There were 0 (0%) unmarried opposite-sex partnerships, and 2 (9.5%) same-sex married couples or partnerships. 6 households (28.6%) were made up of individuals, and 3 (14.3%) had someone living alone who was 65 years of age or older. The average household size was 2.38.  There were 13 families (61.9% of all households); the average family size was 3.08.

The population was spread out, with 11 people (22.0%) under the age of 18, 2 people (4.0%) aged 18 to 24, 10 people (20.0%) aged 25 to 44, 13 people (26.0%) aged 45 to 64, and 14 people (28.0%) who were 65 years of age or older.  The median age was 45.7 years. For every 100 females, there were 78.6 males.  For every 100 females age 18 and over, there were 69.6 males.

The homeowner vacancy rate was 7.1%; the rental vacancy rate was 33.3%.  29 people (58.0% of the population) lived in owner-occupied housing units and 21 people (42.0%) lived in rental housing units.

Fire protection district
The District maintains a fire station in Topaz.

Water district
Topaz is served by the Antelope Valley Water District, which was formed in 1961.

See also
 Slinkard Fire
 Walker, Mono County, California

References

Census-designated places in Mono County, California
Census-designated places in California
1885 establishments in California